The 2022 CFL National Draft was a selection of National players by Canadian Football League (CFL) teams that took place on May 3, 2022, at 8:00 pm ET and was broadcast on TSN and RDS. 74 players were chosen from among eligible players from Canadian Universities across the country, as well as Canadian players playing in the NCAA.

The draft was broadcast live on TSN for the first two rounds. The TSN production was hosted by Farhan Lalji and featured the CFL on TSN panel which included Duane Forde, Davis Sanchez, Marshall Ferguson, and Dave Naylor. Randy Ambrosie, the CFL commissioner, was also present in the TSN studios in Toronto to announce the picks for the first two rounds.

Available players
Due to U Sports cancelling all play in 2020, 132 eligible 2021 draftees exercised their right to defer their draft years to this year's draft. However, the league also permitted NCAA redshirt juniors to be selected in the 2021 draft to balance out the influx of players to this year's draft.

Top prospects
Source: CFL Scouting Bureau rankings.

Note: Dontae Bull, Sidy Sow, Sydney Brown, Tavius Robinson, Jonathan Sutherland, and Lwal Uguak deferred their draft years to 2023 in order to return for their senior years at school.

Draft order

Round one

Round two

Round three

Round four

Round five

Round six

Round seven

Round eight

Supplemental Draft
On May 5, two days after the draft, a supplemental draft was held, with the Edmonton Elks and Calgary Stampeders both forfeiting second round picks in the 2023 CFL Draft to select J-Min Pelley and T. J. Rayam, respectively.

Trades
In the explanations below, (D) denotes trades that took place during the draft, while (PD) indicates trades completed pre-draft.

Round one
 Edmonton ←→ Montreal (PD). Edmonton traded the first overall selection in this draft to Montreal in exchange for the fourth overall selection in this draft and the playing rights for Carter O'Donnell.
 Hamilton → Edmonton (PD). Hamilton traded the eighth overall selection in this draft, the 28th overall selection in this draft, and the ninth overall selection in the 2022 CFL Global Draft to Edmonton in exchange for Kyle Saxelid, Grant McDonald, and the second overall selection in the 2022 CFL Global Draft.
 Winnipeg → Montreal (PD). Winnipeg traded the ninth overall selection in this draft and the 18th overall selection in this draft to Montreal in exchange for Cameron Lawson and the 13th overall selection in this draft.

Round two
 Edmonton → Toronto (PD). Edmonton traded this selection and the rights to a negotiation list player (Chad Kelly) to Toronto in exchange for Nick Arbuckle. The selection would have been a third-round pick, but it was upgraded to a second-round pick when Arbuckle re-signed with the Edmonton Elks through the 2022 season.
 Winnipeg ←→ Montreal (PD). Winnipeg traded the 18th overall selection in this draft and the ninth overall selection in this draft to Montreal in exchange for Cameron Lawson and the 13th overall selection in this draft.

Round three
 Winnipeg → BC (PD). Winnipeg traded a conditional fourth-round selection to BC in exchange for Sergio Castillo. This selection was upgraded to a third-round pick and confirmed upon the release of the draft order.
 Hamilton → Edmonton (PD). Hamilton traded the 28th overall selection in this draft, the eighth overall selection in this draft, and the ninth overall selection in the 2022 CFL Global Draft to Edmonton in exchange for Kyle Saxelid, Grant McDonald, and the second overall selection in the 2022 CFL Global Draft.

See also
 2022 CFL Global Draft

References
Trade references

General references

Canadian College Draft
2022 in Canadian football
CFL Draft